The Eastern Transbaikalian Front was a Soviet partisan front from  April 21, 1919 to October 7, 1920.

Initially it consisted of three regiments which had fought against Grigory Semyonov's troops and the Japanese Expeditionary Corps. Its headquarters was in villages Bogdat and Zilovo. By September 1919 the front had already included  6 cavalry and 2 infantry regiments and 1 Chinese platoon, all in all, there were 3,000 soldiers. Its troops took part in the Battle of Bogdat.

On May 22, 1920 the front joined the 2nd Rifle Division of the Amur Front. The front together with the Amur Front was responsible for retaking Chita in October 1920.

Chief-Commanders
Pavel Zhuravlev from April 21, 1919 to February 23, 1920
Yakov Korotayev from March 2, 1920 to March 21, 1920
Dmitry Shilov from March 21, 1920 to July 20, 1920
Vladimir Londo from July 20, 1920 to September 9, 1920
Vladimir Popov September 9, 1920 to October 7, 1920

See also
 Battle of Bogdat

References

Sources
Шли дивизии вперед: НРА и освобождение Заб. (1920 — 1921): Сб. документов. — Иркутск, 1987.

History of Zabaykalsky Krai
Russian Civil War
Soviet fronts
1919 in Russia
1920 in Russia